Euhagena is a genus of moths in the family Sesiidae.

Species
Euhagena palariformis (Lederer, 1858)
Euhagena palariformis palariformis (Lederer, 1858)
Euhagena palariformis nazir (Le Cerf, 1938)
Euhagena emphytiformis (Walker, 1856)
Euhagena nebraskae Edwards, 1881
Euhagena leucozona (Hampson, 1919)
Euhagena variegata (Walker, [1865])

References

Sesiidae